Melchior Feselen, an historical painter, of Passau, lived at the same time as Altdorfer, whose works he imitated with assiduity. Though he was inferior to that artist, his paintings are rich in composition, with a great number of figures highly finished, and in a style quite peculiar to himself. He died at Ingolstadt in 1538. Among his paintings there are:

Darmstadt. Gallery. The Crucifixion.
Munich. Gallery. The Siege of Rome by Porsena, 1529, and Caesar conquering the town Alesia in Gaul, 1533.
Nuremberg. Museum. The Adoration of the Magi, 1531.
Ratisbon. Hist. Soc. St. Mary of Egypt.

See also
 List of German painters

References

 

Year of birth unknown
1538 deaths
16th-century German painters
German male painters
People from Passau